Alien abduction can refer to the purported abductions of human beings by non-human entities. 

Alien Abduction or alien abduction may also refer to:

Film
Alien Abduction (2005 film), a 2005 science-fiction horror film produced by The Asylum
Alien Abduction (2014 film), a 2014 science-fiction horror film by Matty Beckerman
Alien Abduction: Incident in Lake County, a 1998 found-footage film by Dean Alioto
"Alien Abductions" (Bullshit! episode), a 2003 episode of Penn & Teller: Bullshit!

Other uses
 Alien Abduction, an alternate name for the roller coaster Gravitron
 Alien abduction insurance, an insurance policy issued against alien abduction
 Alien abduction entities, beings alleged to secretly abduct people
 Alien abduction claimants, a list of people claiming to have been abducted by aliens

See also 
 UFO Abduction (film), a 1989 found footage/thriller film